Polarjazz or The Polar Jazz Festival (initiated 1998 in Longyearbyen, Svalbard) is the northernmost jazz festival in the world, and is arranged every year in February.

Background 
The 19th Polarjazz festival took place between 3 and 7 February 2016, with almost 2,500 visitors.  This unique music festival that residents, visiting audience and not least the artists, keep coming back to. Over the years a multitude of the best jazz performers and other musicians have visited Polarjazz. Polarjazz not only offers a varied musical experiences, but also other activities in the polar night. There are provided music for all ages and therefore the festival includes performances both in kindergartens, schools and the youth house. Some musicians are sent to perform for our neighbors in the Russian settlement of Barentsburg.

Artists and bands (in selection) 

3–7 February 2011 
Hot Club de Norvege
Solveig Slettahjell
Beady Belle and PUST
Halvdan Sivertsen
Stian Carstensen

1–5 February 2012
Bård 
Bjelleklang
Christianssands String Swing Ensemble
DeLillos
Kaizers Orchestra
Maria Mena
Ole Paus
The Real Thing

31 January - 3 February 2013
Kari Bremnes
Madcon
The Ukulele Orchestra of Great Britain
Babylon Brothers
Bargoo
Sivert Høyem
Howlin' Huskies

5-9 February 2014
Mezzoforte
Rypdal & Tekrø
Stillhouse
Urban Tunélls Klezmerband

5–8 February 2015
Bo Kaspers Orkester
Violet Road
Vidar Johnsen
Morten Abel
Emilie Nicolas
Bugge Wesseltoft & The Organ Club
Árstíðir
 Nina & the Butterfly Fish
Svalbard Kirkes Trio (World premiere)
Solid Comfort
Nora Konstanse

3-7 February 2015
Per Mathisen and Ulf Wakenius
Sondre Lerche
Ingebjørg Bratland
D'Sound
Lyriaka
SvaJazz
Numa Edema
Sofia Jannok – Susanne Sundfør
Dos Mosquitos
Longyearbyen Storband
Hekla Stålstrenga

References

External links 
 

Longyearbyen
Jazz festivals in Norway
1998 establishments in Norway
Recurring events established in 1998
Music in Longyearbyen
Festivals in Longyearbyen
Annual events in Norway
Winter events in Norway